Ortillo is a village in the province of Murcia, Spain. It is part of the municipality of Lorca.

Lorca, Spain
Populated places in the Region of Murcia